The Literary & Debating Society of Maynooth University is a student-run society in Maynooth University. It was initially founded in 1795 as part of St. Patrick's College Maynooth and is the oldest society on campus. The society believes that the written and spoken word are of equal importance, and therefore the society promotes both the debating and literary sides of the society equally. The society aims to promote freedom of expression, specifically by holding weekly literary and debating events. Its objectives are to initiate, spark, and facilitate debate within the student body. It operates under the Maynooth Students' Union as one of Maynooth University's Clubs & Societies.

Debating

Maynooth Open 
The Maynooth Open is a debating inter-varsity competition open to all university debating societies. The competition was founded in 2010.

Aoife Begley Memorial Schools Competition 
The Aoife Begley competition is an annual secondary schools debating competition hosted and run by the Literary & Debating Society in Maynooth.

See also 
 UCC Philosophical Society
 College Historical Society (Trinity College, Dublin)
 University Philosophical Society (Trinity College, Dublin)
 Literary and Historical Society, University College Dublin
 Literary and Debating Society (NUI Galway)

References

External links
 Official Website

Maynooth University
Student organisations in the Republic of Ireland
Student debating societies
1795 establishments in Ireland